Pseudicius sengwaensis is a jumping spider species in the genus Pseudicius that lives in Zimbabwe. The male was first described in 2011.

References

Endemic fauna of Zimbabwe
Salticidae
Spiders described in 2011
Spiders of Africa
Taxa named by Wanda Wesołowska